The 1962 Syrian coup d'état attempt, also called the March 28 Action, was carried out by Lt. Col. Abd al-Karim al-Nahlawi on 28 March 1962. The same officer, Nahlawi, was in charge of the coup that brought about the disintegration of the United Arab Republic, a federation of Egypt and Syria, exactly six months earlier. Al-Nahlawi issued an order on 28 March for the president to be detained and taken to the General Staff building. He was imprisoned at Mezze Military Hospital. After the ones that were given on 28 September 1961, the radio started airing military announcements.

The escalation of tensions between Nahlawi and Nazim al-Qudsi, the Republic's then-President, who assumed office in December, was one of the coup's primary drivers. The socialist policies Abdel Nasser approved two months prior to the secession are among them, as the military just sought to amend them but the political class preferred to entirely revoke them. Senior officers believed that the Syrians, like a large portion of the military, were still pro-Nasser. Marouf Al-Dawalibi was in disagreement with the officers who backed the socialist decisions, hence Al-Nahlawi requested that Al-Qudsi fire him. He also asked for the removal of Said al-Ghazzi, Maamun al-Kuzbari, and Khalid al-Azm from the political scene, the lifting of some MPs' immunity, and a reduction in the Constituent Assembly's tenure from 18 months to just six. All of these demands were rejected by Al-Qudsi.

Al-Nahlawi anticipated being honored and promoted to a senior position because he thought the politicians should give him credit for what they were able to enjoy in the separatist republic. Al-Nahlawi asserted that the coup was a continuation of the coup from 1961 and that its goals were reform and a change of direction. On 16 April, a technocratic government was established following the failed attempt due to resistance from some military members. Abd al-Karim Zahr al-Din took over as Minister of Defense.

Background

After barely 3 years and 7 months, the state of unification between Egypt and Syria came to an end on 29 September 1961.

References

1962 in Syria
1960s coups d'état and coup attempts
21st century in Damascus
Conflicts in 1962
March 1962 events in Asia
April 1962 events in Asia
Military coups in Syria
Coup d'état attempts in Asia